Lieutenant-General James Durand (died 1766) was a British soldier.

He served as an officer in the 1st Foot Guards, rising to the rank of captain and lieutenant-colonel in May 1748, and to major (with the rank of colonel) in 1753. He was appointed major-general in 1759, and rose to the lieutenant-colonelcy of the 1st Foot Guards in 1760. In 1761 he was appointed lieutenant-general, and in June 1765 made the colonel of the 56th Regiment of Foot. He died in 1766 and was buried at St Mary's, Twickenham on 6 March; his wife Cornelia had been buried there on 12 January the same year.

References

British Army lieutenant generals
1766 deaths
Grenadier Guards officers
56th Regiment of Foot officers
Year of birth unknown
Burials at St Mary's Church, Twickenham